The Legislative Assembly of Novosibirsk Oblast is the regional parliament of Novosibirsk Oblast, a federal subject of Russia. A total of 76 deputies are elected for five-year terms.

According to the Charter Of Novosibirsk Oblast, the Legislative Assembly is "the standing, supreme and exclusive legislative (representative) authority" of the Oblast. The Assembly is responsible for appointing the governor of the region and voting for or against a candidate proposed by the President of Russian Federation.

Elections

2015

2020

List of chairmen

References

Novosibirsk
Politics of Novosibirsk Oblast
Novosibirsk